Wayne A. Hendrickson (born April 25, 1941, New York City) is an American biophysicist and University professor at Columbia. Dr. Hendrickson is a University Professor at Columbia University in the Department of Biochemistry and Molecular Biophysics and Violin Family Professor of Physiology and Cellular Biophysics. He is also Chief Life Scientist in the Photon Sciences Directorate at Brookhaven National Laboratory and Scientific Director of the New York Structural Biology Center. Hendrickson has a B.A. from the University of Wisconsin at River Falls, a Ph.D. in biophysics at Johns Hopkins University with Warner Love, and postdoctoral research experience with Jerome Karle at the Naval Research Laboratory (NRL). He and his colleagues use biochemistry and x-ray crystallography to study molecular properties in atomic detail with current emphasis on membrane receptors and cellular signaling, on viral proteins and HIV infection, on molecular chaperones and protein folding, and on structural genomics of membrane proteins. Hendrickson's advances in diffraction methodology have contributed significantly to the emergence of structural biology as a major force in modern biology and molecular medicine.

His honors include the Aminoff Prize of the Royal Swedish Academy of Sciences, the Gairdner International Award, and the Harvey Prize of the Technion – Israel Institute of Technology. He is a fellow of the American Academy of Arts and Sciences and a member of the National Academy of Sciences. On June 2, 1995 he received an honorary doctorate from the Faculty of Science and Technology at Uppsala University, Sweden

He is best known for innovating the use of multi-wavelength anomalous dispersion as an analytical tool for protein crystallography.
His research group pioneered solving the crystal structures of CD4, CD8, insulin receptor kinase, Hsp70, SRC kinase, HIV gp120, cadherin, FGF and many other proteins that are key for understanding human disease and drug development.

Hendrickson obtained a B.A. in biology and physics from University of Wisconsin-River Falls and a Ph.D in biophysics from Johns Hopkins University. A member of the National Academy of Sciences, he was elected a Fellow of the American Academy of Arts and Sciences in 1992.  He won the Christian B. Anfinsen Award in 1997,  Gairdner Foundation International Award in 2003 and Harvey Prize in 2004.

References

External links
University biography from Columbia University

1941 births
American biophysicists
Columbia University faculty
Fellows of the American Academy of Arts and Sciences
Johns Hopkins University alumni
Living people
Members of the United States National Academy of Sciences
University of Wisconsin–River Falls alumni
Howard Hughes Medical Investigators
People from Spring Valley, Wisconsin